Randolph Murdaugh Sr. (February 28, 1887July 19, 1940) was an American attorney and politician from South Carolina who served as the circuit solicitor for the 14th judicial district from 1920 until his death in 1940. Randolph was the founding patriarch of the South Carolina Murdaugh family. He died when his car was struck by a train.

Early life, education, and family 

Randolph Murdaugh Sr. was born in Varnville on February 28, 1887, the youngest son of Josiah Putnam Murdaugh II (1830August 17, 1912), a wealthy Lowcountry businessman and Confederate States Army veteran, and Annie Marvin Davis (August 4, 1847August 6, 1919), a distant cousin of Confederate President Jefferson Davis. 

Murdaugh received a public school education until high school, when he switched to a private school. He attended the US Naval Academy and graduated from the University of South Carolina (USC) with a bachelor's of arts in 1908 and from its law school in 1910. He married Etta Causey Harvey in 1914 and they had two sons together, Randolph "Buster" Murdaugh Jr. and John Glen "Johnny" Murdaugh.

In 1911 and 1915, he was appointed to the school board for Hampton County for two-year terms. In 1912, 1916, and 1918 he was a delegate for Hampton County to the Democratic Party state convention.
He founded The Hampton County Herald in 1916.

Circuit solicitor
In 1920, incumbent solicitor for the 14th judicial circuit George Warren resigned in March 1920 to run for U.S. Senate; Murdaugh quickly announced his campaign for the open circuit solicitor seat the same month.
He faced Heber Padgett and R.M. Jefferies in the Democratic primary and was endorsed by the Hampton County Democratic Party. He advanced to a runoff with Jefferies after the August 31st primary. He won the runoff and the seat in the September runoff. In 1920 he became the solicitor in the 14th judicial circuit.
The same year he was elected, T. Hagood Gooding was re-elected as Hampton County auditor despite Gooding being known as particularly corrupt and having been prosecuted by the state tax commission under Governor Robert Archer Cooper in 1919.
Murdaugh prosecuted both Gooding and W.A. Mason, another county auditor, for the state eventually leading to their removal from office.
In 1922, he prosecuted Colleton County sheriff W.B. Ackerman for embezzlement.
While solicitor, he represented a governor, prosecuted another, and was known to fill the courthouse gallery during murder trials.
He held the position until 1940 when he was killed in a collision between his car and a freight train.

Personal life and Death 
Murdaugh was an Episcopalian, member of the Freemasons, Knights of Pythias, member of the Benevolent and Protective Order of Elks, Woodman of the World, and member of the Junior Order of United American Mechanics and Sigma Alpha Epsilon fraternities.

His car "crashed into a Charleston and Western Carolina freight train at a grade crossing about five miles south of Varnville." In the months before his death, Randolph was sick and his son, Randolph "Buster" Murdaugh Jr., would frequently fill in for him at court. The death was officially ruled an accident by the coroner. After his death, Buster sued Charleston and Western Carolina Railway and the parties settled for an undisclosed sum.

References 

1887 births
1940 deaths
20th-century American politicians
Randolph Murdaugh Sr.
People from Hampton County, South Carolina
Railroad crossing accidents in the United States
Railway accident deaths in the United States
Road incident deaths in South Carolina
South Carolina Democrats
South Carolina state solicitors
United States Naval Academy alumni
University of South Carolina School of Law alumni